Assiniboia was a federal electoral district in Saskatchewan, Canada, that was represented in the House of Commons of Canada from 1908 to 1988. This riding was created in 1907 following the admission of Saskatchewan into the Canadian Confederation in 1905.

The riding was located in the southeast corner of Saskatchewan until the 1949 election, when it was moved westward to be based around the community of Assiniboia. The riding's territory before and after the 1949 election did not overlap. Most of its pre-1949 territory was transferred to Moose Mountain with a small part being transferred to Qu'Appelle. Its new territory was carved out of parts of Wood Mountain and Weyburn.

It was abolished in 1987 when it was redistributed into Moose Jaw—Lake Centre, Regina—Qu'Appelle, Regina—Wascana, Souris—Moose Mountain and Swift Current—Maple Creek—Assiniboia ridings.

Election results

See also 

 List of Canadian federal electoral districts
 Past Canadian electoral districts

External links 
 

Former federal electoral districts of Saskatchewan